The 1000 km of Castellet is a Blancpain Endurance Series sports car race held at Circuit Paul Ricard in Le Castellet, France.  The race began in 1970 as a round of the European 2-Litre Sportscar Championship, and World Sportscar Championship rounds were held in 1974 and 1977.  The race was a French national championship race in the 1980s.  It was revived in 1998 by the International Sports Racing Series and again in 2010 by the Le Mans Series as an 8-hour race. In 2015, the event returned to its 1000 km format making it only the second time to use that distance since 1974.

Depending on the class-type and the year run, the race has been run as a 2 hour, 2.5 hour, 3 hour, 4 hour, 6 hour or 8 hour event, or as a 200 mile, 225 km, 500 km or 1,000 km eventas shown in the race results in the tables below.

Results

Sports car races

GT races

References

External links
Racing Sports Cars: Paul Ricard archive

 
Recurring sporting events established in 1970